Sophie Chiche is a life strategist, journalist, entrepreneur, author and psychologist. She is the founder and curator of lifebyme.com. Chiche is also the founder of Shape House. And the founder of becurrenttoday.com, a methodology dedicated to bringing purpose back to productivity. SophieChicihe.com is her new venture. Coaching High Performers from what they have to what they want. She is also the Show Runner of the upcoming TV show War and Piece of Cake and author of the upcoming memoir Closer to my Bones, a journey of 200 lost pounds.

Chiche received her master's degree in business, Journalism from ESIAE [France], and a master's in Applied Psychology from the University of Santa Monica.

Career
Chiche previously served as the American correspondent of Psychologies European publication and CEO of IMPAQ. She published The Power of Personal Accountability: Achieve What Matters to You with Mark Samuel in 2004. In 2010, Chiche founded lifebyme.com, an online community focused on sharing meaning. Deepak Chopra, Arianna Huffington, Seth Godin, Mariel Hemingway, Kenny Loggins and Jason Mraz have contributed to the website. She spoke at a TEDx event in December 2011. and at Malibu TEDx in December 2012.

LifeByMe.com 
Chiche is the founder of LifeByMe.com, an online platform where all sorts of people share meaning.

Shape House
Chiche is the founder of Shape House, an infrared sauna located in Los Angeles, California. Demi Moore, Selena Gomez, LL Cool J, the Kardashians visit regularly.

Be Current Today 
Chiche is the founder of Be Current, an innovative methodology that turns traditional productivity on its head.

SophieChiche.com 
Chiche is the founder of SophieChiche.com, an innovative coaching approach to close the gap between what you want and what you have.

Filmography
 The Inner Weigh (2010)
War and Piece of Cake (2021)

Bibliography
 The Power of Personal Accountability: Achieve What Matters to You (2004) 
Petite Eloge de le Reponsabilité, French Edition (2005)

Press 
Huffington Post (https://www.huffpost.com/author/sophie-chiche)

Groomed LA (https://groomed-la.com/need-read-guest-post-sophie-chiche-shape-house/)

LA Times (https://www.latimes.com/health/la-he-treatments-20131214-story.html)

NY Times (Why Some Like It Hotter (Published 2016))

Forbes (The Secret to Making New Year's Resolutions Stick)

Hollywood Reporter (https://www.hollywoodreporter.com/news/selena-gomezs-sweat-bed-shape-896826)

Lucire (http://lucire.com/2011/0726ll0.shtml)

Rank & Style (https://www.rankandstyle.com/talking-top-10/20180924/sophie-chiche)

Podcast 
That's So Retrograde (https://thatssoretrograde.com/2018/04/05/sweat-rograde/)

Creating the Impossible (Creating the Impossible with Michael Neill: Success Beyond Nutella and Mayonnaise with Sophie Chiche on Apple Podcasts)

IGNTD (https://www.igntd.com/relationshipspodcast/an-incredible-journey-to-health-from-the-inside-and-out-with-sophie-chiche-founder-of-shape-house)

Outliers (Ep04 Sophie Chiche by Outliers TV Podcast)

Dot Complicated with Randi Zuckerberg The Future of Fitness  (Randi Zuckerberg)

DENTalks (https://dentalkspodcast.com/sophie-chiche-dont-sweat-the-small-stuff/)

SlowMo (https://www.theurbanyou.com/blog/slowmo-shapehouse)

Boss Babe (https://www.globalplayer.com/podcasts/episodes/7DraKYP/)

School For Good Living (https://podcasts.goodliving.com/2020/03/03/the-power-of-personal-accountability-with-sophie-chiche/)

Morning Yo with Michael Yo

References

External links
Official website

American women psychologists
21st-century American psychologists
Writers from Los Angeles
University of Santa Monica alumni
Year of birth missing (living people)
Living people
21st-century American women